The Graf–Navratilova rivalry was a tennis rivalry between Steffi Graf and Martina Navratilova, widely regarded as two of the greatest tennis players of all time. They met 18 times during their careers, and their head-to-head is even at 9–9, with Graf having a 4–2 record in major finals but Navratilova having a 5–4 record in overall major matches (winning their last major meeting despite being 34 at the time). They contested three consecutive Wimbledon singles finals (1987, 1988, 1989). Notably, despite how even their rivalry was, the age difference between Navratilova and Graf is more than 12.5 years.

List of all matches

Graf–Navratilova (9–9)

Breakdown of the rivalry 
Hard courts: Navratilova, 5–2
Clay courts: Graf, 2–0
Grass courts: Graf, 2–1
Carpet courts: Equal, 3–3
Grand Slam matches: Navratilova, 5–4
Grand Slam finals: Graf, 4–2
Year-End Championships matches: Navratilova, 2–1
Year-End Championships finals: Equal, 1–1
Fed Cup matches: None
All finals: Graf, 8–4
All matches: Equal, 9–9

Set tallies

See also
List of tennis rivalries
List of Grand Slam related tennis records

References

Tennis rivalries
Steffi Graf
Martina Navratilova